In enzymology, a quinine 3-monooxygenase is an enzyme that catalyzes the chemical reaction

quinine + NADPH + H+ + O2  3-hydroxyquinine + NADP+ + H2O

The 4 substrates of this enzyme are quinine, NADPH, H+, and O2, whereas its 3 products are 3-hydroxyquinine, NADP+, and H2O.

This enzyme belongs to the family of oxidoreductases, specifically those acting on paired donors, with O2 as oxidant and incorporation or reduction of oxygen. The oxygen incorporated need not be derived from O2 with NADH or NADPH as one donor, and incorporation of one atom o oxygen into the other donor.  The systematic name of this enzyme class is quinine,NADPH:oxygen oxidoreductase. This enzyme is also called quinine 3-hydroxylase.

Structural studies

References

 
 
 
 

EC 1.14.13
NADPH-dependent enzymes
Enzymes of known structure